E404 was supposed to be a European B class road in Belgium, connecting the cities Jabbeke and Zeebrugge. However, the road was not built according to the original plans. The number is nevertheless given to a route between the two cities, but it is not signposted or on any maps.

Route 
 
 E40 Jabbeke
 E34, E403 Zeebrugge

External links 
 UN Economic Commission for Europe: Overall Map of E-road Network (2007)

International E-road network
Roads in Belgium